Orseolia is a genus of flies belonging to the family Cecidomyiidae.

The species of this genus are found in Southeastern Asia and Northern America.

Species:

Orseolia andropogonis 
Orseolia apludae 
Orseolia bengalensis 
Orseolia bonzii 
Orseolia caulicola 
Orseolia ceylanica 
Orseolia ceylonica 
Orseolia cornea 
Orseolia cynodontis 
Orseolia difficilis 
Orseolia fluvialis 
Orseolia graminicola 
Orseolia graminis 
Orseolia indica 
Orseolia ischaemi 
Orseolia javanica 
Orseolia lourdusamyi 
Orseolia miscanthi 
Orseolia mnesitheae 
Orseolia monticola 
Orseolia nwanzei 
Orseolia orientalis 
Orseolia oryzae 
Orseolia oryzivora 
Orseolia paspali 
Orseolia paspalumi 
Orseolia polliniae 
Orseolia sallae 
Orseolia similis

References

Cecidomyiidae
Cecidomyiidae genera
Insect pests of millets